Ackerson is a surname. People with this surname include:

 Duane Ackerson (1942-2020), American poet and fiction writer
 Ed Ackerson (1965-2019), American musician (Polara) and producer
 Jon Ackerson (born 1943), American lawyer and politician
 Nels Ackerson, American lawyer and politician

See also
Ackerson, Michigan
Ackerson, New Jersey
Ackerson Creek, a river in California
Ackerson Mountain, a mountain in California
T. B. Ackerson Company, American real estate company